Luigi Marfut (16 April 1904 in Rome – 1980) was an Italian boxer who competed in the 1924 Summer Olympics. In 1924 he was eliminated in the second round of the lightweight class after losing his fight to the eventual silver medalist Alfredo Copello.

References

External links
Luigi Marfut's profile at Sports Reference.com

1904 births
1980 deaths
Boxers from Rome
Lightweight boxers
Olympic boxers of Italy
Boxers at the 1924 Summer Olympics
Italian male boxers
20th-century Italian people